The copyright status of works produced by the governments of states, territories, and municipalities in the United States varies.  Copyright law is federal in the United States.  Federal law expressly denies U.S. copyright protection to two types of government works: works of the U.S. federal government itself, and all edicts of any government regardless of level or whether or not foreign.  Other than addressing these "edicts of government", U.S. federal law does not address copyrights of U.S. state and local government.

The U.S. Copyright Office gives guidance that "Works (other than edicts of government) prepared by officers or employees of any government (except the U.S. Government) including State, local, or foreign governments, are subject to registration if they are otherwise copyrightable."  This leaves such works with the usual copyright protection unless applicable state or local law declares otherwise.  Those laws, in turn, vary widely: Some state and local governments expressly claim copyright over some or all of their copyrightable works, while others waive copyright and declare that all government-produced documents are in the public domain.  Some states' policies on the copyright of governmental works are not clearly defined.

States

Arizona
Works by the Arizona state government "are not in the public domain and are protected by copyright." Permission is generally required to use public records for commercial purposes. The Arizona State Library, Archives and Public Records, a division of the Arizona Secretary of State, tells readers that permission for commercial use must be obtained according to procedures described in ARS § 39-121.03.

California
In 2009, the California Court of Appeal for the Sixth District, which has statewide jurisdiction,  ruled, in County of Santa Clara v. California First Amendment Coalition, that the California Public Records Act did not provide authority for copyrighting government records subject to disclosure under the act. The Court noted that other provisions of California law do expressly provide for the copyright of specific types of materials created by the state. The court noted that:

Florida

Under Florida's Constitution and its statutes, the state and its agents are not permitted to claim copyright on its public records unless the legislature specifically permits it. This includes a work made or received pursuant to law or ordinance or in connection with the transaction of official business by any state, regional, county, district, municipal, or other units of government and their associated committees and divisions created or established by the laws of the Government of Florida. Text, communications, and images produced by the government of Florida and any county, region, district, authority, agency, or municipal officer, department, division, board, committee, bureau, commission, or another separate unit of government created or established by law are consequently in the public domain according to court interpretation in Microdecisions, Inc. v. Skinner (2004).

The bar on copyright extends to any "public record made or received in connection with the official business of any public body, officer, or employee of the state, or persons acting on their behalf, except concerning records exempted [specifically by statute or specifically made exempt or] confidential by the Constitution. [It] specifically includes the legislative, executive, and judicial branches of government and each agency or department created thereunder; counties, municipalities, and districts; and each constitutional officer, board, and commission, or entity created under law or [the Florida] Constitution."

There are various categories of works for which the legislature has specifically permitted copyright to be claimed, mostly for a few applications or development processes wherein the state derives income and while competing with private industries in the commercial realm, such as allowing the department of the lottery, the department of citrus, and some university research departments to secure copyrights for certain works that are expressly defined and narrowly limited. The list of valid exemptions is culled regularly via a sunset policy to exclude items put on the list by error or via legislation passed within a recent session that does not conform to the laws. The state is attempting to streamline its exemptions and the current status of works claiming an exemption must be verified as conforming to the laws before being presumed to be copyright since copyright may be claimed in error for things that remain a public record nonetheless.

Indiana
Indiana's public records law does not allow public agencies (not state agencies as defined in Indiana Code 4-13-1-1) to place restrictions on public records:
"that requires the public to obtain a license or pay copyright royalties for obtaining the right to inspect and copy the records unless otherwise provided by applicable statute;
if the contract, obligation, license, or copyright unreasonably impairs the right of the public to inspect and copy the agency's public records"

Massachusetts
The Secretary of the Commonwealth of Massachusetts informs the public that:

Those records created by Massachusetts government agencies and institutions held by the Massachusetts Archives are not copyrighted and are available for public use. Copyright for materials submitted to state agencies may be held by the person or organization that created the document. Patrons are responsible for clearing copyright on such materials.

Minnesota
There are conflicting official legal opinions on the correct interpretation of state law, and courts have yet to rule on how to interpret the law. A state commissioner's statement from December 1994 reads, in part, "unless specified by the legislature, the public's right of access to and use of public government data cannot be curtailed by a government entity's claim of intellectual property rights in those data". The reading of that as meaning "public domain", however, is contradicted by this statement from December 1995 which comes from the Attorney General, claims to be of higher authority, and explicitly references the prior statement and clarifies that it should be read as applying to access to the data, and not the copyright of the data, and offers alternative phrasing for the above-quoted portion: "The department may not assert copyright ownership to deny members of the public their right "to inspect and copy public government data at reasonable times and places" under Minn. Stat. § 13.03, subd. 3 (1994)."  A key question is how to interpret this statute, which reads:

For purposes of subd. 5, "Government entity" means a state agency, statewide system, or political subdivision. Political subdivisions include counties, cities, towns, school districts, and certain nonprofit corporations, each of which has authority under subd. 5 to enforce copyrights of works it has created, as does any state office, officer, department, division, bureau, board, commission, authority, district or agency of the state, the University of Minnesota, and the state itself.

New Jersey
It is the policy of the state of New Jersey that all documents originating from web sites of executive departments and non-independent agencies are "available to the public and anyone may view, copy or distribute State information found here without obligation to the State" unless the document specifically states otherwise. Likewise, all records obtain from the state, county, or local government entities in New Jersey via the state's Open Public Records Act (OPRA), per a 2009 decision of the New Jersey Supreme Court, may be reproduced including for commercial purposes.

According to the New Jersey Open Data Initiative Act, all information listed on state agencies open data web portals, "shall be treated as license-free, subject to reuse, and not subject to copyright restrictions". This effectively makes data published under this act in the public domain.

New York
Courts have ruled that in general, works of this state are subject to copyright restrictions.

North Carolina
North Carolina statute holds that "The public records and public information compiled by the agencies of North Carolina government or its subdivisions are the property of the people.  Therefore, it is the policy of this State that the people may obtain copies of their public records and public information free or at minimal cost unless otherwise specifically provided by law." The State Library of North Carolina considers state documents within its collection to be in the public domain according to U.S. copyright law. Though state law in general describes state and local records as "property of the people", it describes some specific types of records that may have copyright held by the state. These include "archaeological resources which are collected, excavated or removed from State lands and associated records and data" and "original tapes, notes, discs or other records" created via "stenotype, shorthand, or stenomask equipment" as part of trial recording.

Pennsylvania
According to Pennsylvania statute, "The Department of General Services shall have the power, and its duty shall be… [t]o copyright, in the name of the Commonwealth, all publications of the Commonwealth, or of any department, board, or commission or officer thereof, including the State Reports, which under existing or future laws it shall be necessary to have copyrighted, and such other publications as the Secretary of Property and Supplies,  1 with the approval of the Governor, shall deem it advisable to copyright."

South Carolina
The Supreme Court of South Carolina held in Seago v. Horry County that a South Carolina county can hold copyrights on government works.

Utah
The current public records law, the Government Records Access and Management Act (GRAMA), is found at Utah Code Ann. § 63G-2-101. All records created or maintained by a state governmental entity are the property of the state (Utah Code Ann. § 63A-12-105). Government entities may control their copyright by ordinance or policy (Utah Code Ann. § 63G-2-201).

Washington
Works created by the state of Washington are copyrighted. Works published by the Secretary of State of Washington are voluntarily released into the public domain.

Government outside states

Some parts of the United States are not within U.S. states and instead derive their authority from federal acts of Congress.  They have varying degrees of autonomy, which affects whether their governments' works are public domain works of the United States government, which the current Copyright Act of 1976 describes as "a work prepared by an officer or employee of the United States Government as part of that person's official duties".

Compendium of U.S. Copyright Office Practices, Third Edition (2014) gives guidance about which jurisdictions are, or are not the United States government:
 Works of the governments of the District of Columbia, the Commonwealth of Puerto Rico, and the "organized territories" (incorporated or unincorporated) are considered U.S. Government works.
 For the unorganized territories, "Domicile or first publication in any of the territorial areas under the jurisdiction of the U.S. government — other than the several states, the District of Columbia, and the Commonwealth of Puerto Rico, and the organized territories — does not confer eligibility for [copyright] registration. Such areas include the unorganized territories, the trust territories, and other possessions of the United States." Registration may be permitted, however, depending on the nationality of the individual. However, some older works in the unorganized territories may be copyrightable. Copyright renewal was required for works published or registered on or before December 31, 1963, but not for works published or registered after that date. "For renewal registration purposes, the United States comprises the States, the District of Columbia, the Commonwealth of Puerto Rico, Guam, U.S. Virgin Islands, Panama Canal Zone, America Samoa, and other trust territories. For the manufacturing requirements, unorganized areas under the jurisdiction of the United States (such as Guam, Panama Canal Zone, Virgin Islands, and American Samoa) are not considered a part of the United States."

See also 
 List of U.S. state legal codes

References

External links 
 

United States copyright law
State law in the United States
United States government information